Karataş is a light-rail station on the Konak Tram of the Tram İzmir system in İzmir, Turkey. It is located along the Mustafa Kemal Coastal Boulevard in Karataş, Konak. The station consists of two side platforms serving two tracks.

Karataş station opened on 24 March 2018.

Connections
ESHOT operates city bus service on İnönü Avenue.

Nearby Places of Interest
Asansör - A historical elevator tower.

References

Railway stations opened in 2018
2018 establishments in Turkey
Konak District
Tram transport in İzmir